Madhapuram is a small village located around 16 km from Khammam district headquarters in Telangana State, India, and 200 km from Hyderabad. The village is in the Mudigonda Mandal. It has a population of under 3000.

90% of the people are engaged in agriculture. The literacy rate is around 65%.

Geography
Madhapuram is bounded by Kattakur Village to the east, Aregudam village to the north south/east, Rajeswarpuram village to the south, Nelapatla/Venkatapuram village to the west, Munigapalli Village to the north and Yedavalli to the north east.

Demographics
Households: 	        625
Total population: 	2,560
Male population: 	1,298
Female population: 	1,262
Children under 6 yrs: 	312
Boys under 6 yrs: 	167
Girls under 6 yrs: 	145
Total literates: 	1,300
Total illiterates: 	1,260

External links
Land records

Schools
M.P.Primary School
Z.P.High School

Villages in Khammam district